The Mansfield and District Cricket League (MDCL) is a Sunday League, founded in 1947. The league in 2022 listed 59 teams from 53 clubs split into 6 Divisions, with regionalisation of the divisions organised into the bottom 4 sections. The League headquarters is based in Rotherham.

The Mansfield and District Cricket League traditionally covers the northern half of Nottinghamshire's Sunday recreational cricket, with the Newark Club Cricket Alliance covering the south, but a significant number of clubs also take part from Derbyshire and South Yorkshire. Since 2007, Welbeck has held the highest number of league championship titles, with their latest win in 2022.

Past winners

Performance by season from 2007

References

External links
 

English domestic cricket competitions
Cricket in South Yorkshire
Cricket in Derbyshire
Cricket in Nottinghamshire
Club cricket